Chirk is a town and community in Wrexham County Borough, Wales,  south of Wrexham, between it and Oswestry. At the 2011 census, it had a population of 4,468. Historically in the traditional county of Denbighshire, and later Clwyd, it has been part of Wrexham County Borough since a local government reorganisation in 1996. The border with the English county of Shropshire is immediately south of the town, on the other side of the River Ceiriog.

The town is served by Chirk railway station and the A5/A483 roads.

Etymology 
The name of the town in English, Chirk, derives from the name of the River Ceiriog, which itself may mean "the favoured one". The Welsh place name, is literarally "The Moor".

History and heritage

Chirk Castle, a National Trust property, is a medieval castle. Two families are associated with the town and its castle: the Trevor family of Brynkinallt and the Myddelton family. The Hughes of Gwerclas, a family descended from the ancient kings of Powys Fadog, also lived in the area for many years.

Other attractions in the town include a section of Offa's Dyke and the Chirk Aqueduct, part of a larger World Heritage Site including Pontcysyllte aqueduct, on the Llangollen Canal, built in 1801 by Thomas Telford. The Glyn Valley Tramway terminated on the canal near the mainline railway station.

The parish church of St Mary's is a Grade I listed building. The current church building was begun during the 11th century by the Normans, although it is believed that an older llan, dedicated to St Tysilio, had existed on the site. Indeed, the current church was dedicated to St Tysilio until the late 15th or early 16th century, after which it was re-dedicated to St Mary. Today, the church is a member of the Open Church Network and participates in the Sacred Space Project.

Chirk was formerly a coal mining community with coal being worked from the 17th to the 20th century. The two largest collieries were Black Park (one of the oldest in the north of Wales) and Brynkinallt. These coal mines have now closed.

Chirk was a coaching stop on the old mail coach route along the A5 from London to Holyhead.

The Chester to Ruabon railway had been extended south to Shrewsbury by 1848, with stations at Llangollen Road (Whitehurst Halt, near Pentre) and Chirk; the Castle owners insisted that the railway not be visible to them and that the station be well outside the town lest it encourage the populace to travel. South of the town a railway viaduct was constructed by Henry Robertson to take the line over the Ceiriog Valley.

The Llangollen branch of the Shropshire Union Canal runs through Chirk. The canal crosses the Ceiriog Valley (from England into Wales) along Thomas Telford's aqueduct. Telford's aqueduct runs alongside the railway viaduct before the canal enters the Chirk Tunnel.

Modern day

Agriculture continues to be of some importance, as does tourism. The National Trust's Chirk Castle  is an attraction, as are the World Heritage Site of the Llangollen Canal, and the local scenery of the Ceiriog Valley and Berwyn Mountains. Manufacturing now plays a prominent position within the local industries, with major international firms such as Kronospan and Mondelez UK  maintaining sites in the town. There are small business which support the local communities and its visitors, as well as service industries such as hotels, leisure facilities and restaurants. There are a wide range of employment opportunities and professions.

Religion no longer has a prominent position, but there are four churches: St Mary's (Church in Wales), Chirk Methodist Church, Sacred Heart (Roman Catholic) and the Community Church.

Chirk is served by two local primary schools: Ysgol Y Waun and Pentre Church in Wales Controlled School.

Ysgol Y Waun is the main primary school for children in Chirk. It was formed in 2012, by the merger of Chirk Infants School and Ceiriog Junior School. Ysgol Y Waun is a nursery, infant and junior school of mixed gender and lessons are taught through the medium of English. The school has about 335 pupils, with an increasing number of pupils on free school meals: 19.7% in 2014, which is above the Local Authority average but below the Wales average.

Pentre School is a nursery, infant and junior school of mixed gender. There are approximately 86 pupils on roll who are all taught through the medium of English. Welsh is taught as a compulsory part of the school curriculum as a second language. The school is in a relatively affluent area, with only 15.9% of the school population eligible for free school meals, which is substantially below the Local Authority and Wales averages.

Most pupils in the community attend Ysgol Dinas Brân, Llangollen, for their secondary education. Ysgol Dinas Brân is a relatively large, bilingual secondary school catering for pupils from ages 11 – 19 (including Sixth Form). Other secondary schools in the area include Ysgol Rhiwabon, St Martin's School (Shropshire) and St Joseph's in Wrexham. The area is served by independent schools, such as Moreton Hall and Ellesmere College in neighbouring Shropshire.

Although Chirk is a predominantly English-speaking area, some parents choose to educate their children through the medium of Welsh. The nearest Welsh-medium primary schools are in Glyn Ceiriog and Cefn Mawr. Pupils can then transfer to either Ysgol Dinas Brân, Llangollen or Ysgol Morgan Llwyd, Wrexham for Welsh-medium secondary education.

The Ceiriog Memorial Institute, in the Ceiriog valley, just west of Chirk, is home to a collection of Welsh cultural memorabilia and was founded in the early 1900s to support the Welsh language, culture and heritage for future generations.

In the 2011 census, a total of 3,652 residents (81.7%) have no skills in the Welsh language.

Sport
Chirk is home to Chirk AAA F.C., a football team founded in 1876. Currently playing in the Cymru North (the second tier of Welsh football). 

Chirk Golf Club was founded in 1991. The club closed in September 2012.

Notable people

 Sir Edward Trevor (ca.1580–1642), founder of the fortunes of the Trevor dynasty
 Sir Thomas Myddelton, 1st Baronet (1624–1663), MP for Flint Boroughs
 Sir Thomas Myddelton, 2nd Baronet (ca.1651–1684), MP for Denbighshire
 Sir Richard Myddelton, 3rd Baronet (1655–1716), of Chirk Castle, MP for Denbighshire 
 Robert Roberts (1680–1741), cleric and writer.
 Frederick West (1767–1852), MP for Denbigh Boroughs
 Robert Myddelton Biddulph (1805–1872), MP for Denbigh Boroughs
 Joseph Fletcher (1813–1852), barrister and statistician
 Edwin Hill-Trevor, 1st Baron Trevor (1819–1894), MP for County Down (estate at Brynkinalt)
 R. S. Thomas (1913–2000), a Welsh poet and Anglican priest 
 Ian Hamilton (born 1946), a Canadian mystery writer, former journalist and civil servant
 Peter Edwards, (born 1955), painter, he won the 1994 BP Portrait Award.

Sport 
 Di Jones (1867–1902), footballer with 342 club caps and 14 for Wales
 Hugh Morris (1872–1897), footballer with 59 club caps and 3 for Wales 
 Billy Meredith (1874–1958), footballer with 680 club caps and 48 for Wales
 Lot Jones (1882–1941), footballer with over 300 club caps and 20 for Wales
 Harry Millership (1889-1959), footballer with 124 club caps and 6 for Wales
 Stan Davies (1898–1972), footballer with over 220 club caps and 18 for Wales
 John Hulme (born 1950), cricketer, left-handed batsman
 Paul Jones (born 1967), footballer with 583 club caps and 50 for Wales
 Neil Thomas (born 1968), retired World Champion artistic gymnast
 Mike Jones (born 1987), footballer with over 450 club caps

See also
Chirk Bank

References

G. G. Lerry, "Collieries of Denbighshire", 1968

External links

Chirk Town Council website
BBC Wales – Chirk website 
The Glyn Valley Tramway Trust in Chirk
St Mary's Church, Chirk
History of St Marys, Chirk
Wrexham & Shropshire Railway

 
Towns in Wrexham County Borough
Communities in Wrexham County Borough
Towns of the Welsh Marches